Mathieu Bouyer (born January 17, 1987 in Nantes) is a French professional football player. Currently, he plays in CFA for Cholet. Besides France, he has played in  Spain.

He played on the professional level in Segunda División for Racing de Ferrol.

References

External links

1987 births
Living people
French footballers
French expatriate footballers
Expatriate footballers in Spain
Racing de Ferrol footballers
SD Lemona footballers
Barakaldo CF footballers
Thouars Foot 79 players
Trélissac FC players
SO Cholet players
Association football midfielders
Footballers from Nantes
Brittany international footballers